

The Caproni Ca.18 was a military reconnaissance aircraft built in Italy shortly prior to World War I. It became the first Italian-designed and -built aircraft to see service with the Italian armed forces. The Ca.18 was a monoplane of conventional configuration and fixed tailskid undercarriage. The wings were mounted to the fuselage with a bayonet fitting, to facilitate the rapid erection and dismantling of the aircraft.

Originally designed for a government competition in early 1913, no production order for the aircraft was forthcoming until the nationalisation of the Caproni company later in the year, whereupon a small batch was built for the 15th Squadron.

Operators

 Corpo Aeronautico Militare

Specifications

References

External links

Ca.018
1910s Italian military reconnaissance aircraft
Military aircraft of World War I
Shoulder-wing aircraft
Single-engined tractor aircraft
Aircraft first flown in 1913
Rotary-engined aircraft